William Huie Duncan is an American diplomat who has served as the United States ambassador to El Salvador since February 2023.

Education 

Duncan received a Bachelor’s degree and a Juris Doctor from the University of Arkansas.

Career 

Duncan is a career member of the Senior Foreign Service with the rank of Minister-Counselor; he has served a Foreign Service officer since 1992. During his career, he served as consul general in Monterrey, Mexico, in addition to serving as deputy chief of mission at U.S. Embassy Mexico City, Mexico. He has also served other missions in Asunción, Madrid, Baghdad, Mexico City, Bogotá, San Salvador, and Matamoros. His domestic assignments include the Offices of Andean Affairs, Mexican Affairs, East African Affairs, and Central American Affairs, as well as the State Department Operations Center.

United States ambassador to El Salvador
On February 25, 2022, President Joe Biden nominated Duncan to be the next United States Ambassador to El Salvador. Hearings on his nomination were held before the Senate Foreign Relations Committee on July 28, 2022. His nomination was favorably reported by the committee on August 3, 2022. The United States Senate confirmed Duncan on December 13, 2022, by voice vote. He was sworn in by Assistant Secretary Brian A. Nichols on January 24, 2023, and he presented his credentials to President Nayib Bukele on February 2, 2023.

Personal life
Duncan speaks Spanish.

See also
Ambassadors of the United States

References

Living people
Year of birth missing (living people)
Place of birth missing (living people)
20th-century American diplomats
20th-century American lawyers
21st-century American diplomats
21st-century American lawyers
American consuls
United States Foreign Service personnel
University of Arkansas alumni
University of Arkansas School of Law alumni